The 6th Arabian Gulf Cup was the sixth edition of the Arabian Gulf Cup. The tournament was held at the Zayed Sports City Stadium in Abu Dhabi, United Arab Emirates and took place between 19 March and 4 April 1982. Kuwait won their fifth title after defeating Oman 2–0 on 29 March.

Iraq also took part in the competition, but they withdrew after their match against the UAE.

Match officials

Tournament 
The teams played a single round-robin style competition. The team achieving first place in the overall standings was the tournament winner.

Matches

1 The match was declared null and void after Iraq withdrew from the competition.

Result

References

External links
Results from 1982 Gulf Cup at RSSSF.com

1982
1982
1982 in Asian football
1981–82 in Saudi Arabian football
1981–82 in Emirati football
1981–82 in Kuwaiti football
1981–82 in Qatari football
1981–82 in Bahraini football
1982 in Oman